Fjordgård Chapel is a chapel of the Church of Norway in Senja Municipality in Troms og Finnmark county, Norway. It is located in the village of Fjordgård on the northern part of the island of Senja. It is an annex chapel for the Lenvik parish which is part of the Senja prosti (deanery) in the Diocese of Nord-Hålogaland. The white, wooden church was built in a long church style in 1976 using plans drawn up by the architectural firm Rik. Bjørn A/S. The church seats about 110 people.

See also
List of churches in Nord-Hålogaland

References

Senja
Churches in Troms
Wooden churches in Norway
20th-century Church of Norway church buildings
Churches completed in 1976
1976 establishments in Norway
Long churches in Norway